Fickle Friends are an English indie rock band from Brighton, East Sussex, England. The band formed in 2013, and is made up of Natassja Shiner (vocals, keyboard), Harry Herrington (bass, backing vocals), Sam Morris (drums) and Jack Wilson (keyboards). Natassja met Sam at Liverpool Institute for Performing Arts and met Chris, Harry and Jack the following year in BIMM Brighton.

After two years touring the UK and Europe without a label or publisher and playing 53 festivals across 2 years, Fickle Friends signed to Polydor Records. The band recorded their debut album in Los Angeles with Mike Crossey and it was released on 16 March 2018 during a promotional UK tour. Fickle Friends' debut album You Are Someone Else was released on 16 March that year, and entered the UK Albums Chart at No. 9.

History

2013–2015: Formation and touring
The band formed in 2013.

They released the single "Swim" early 2014. 31 March they released the single "Play". On 15 September they released their next single "For You".

25 May 2015 they released their first EP Velvet. On 6 October they released the single "Say No More".

2015–2018: You Are Someone Else
The band released the single "Cry Baby" on 27 July 2016. On 3 November they released "Brooklyn".

9 March 2017 they released the single "Hello, Hello". On 15 July they released the single "Hard to be Myself". On 11 August they released their next EP Glue. They re-released their single "Swim" on 22 November.

Fickle Friends debut album You are Someone Else a lyric from the single and featured track "Brooklyn" was announced 21 November 2017. Their last single leading up to the albums release was "Wake Me Up" which was released on 2 March 2018.

The album was released on 16 March 2018, reaching a peak place at no. 9 on the UK chart.

On 14 June, the band released You are someone Else: Versions, an EP of variations of tracks from their debut album.

6 September they released the track "Broken Sleep". 5 October they released "The Moment". 9 November they released the final song in this trio EP "San Francisco".

2019–2022: Weird Years and Are We Gonna Be Alright?
The Band released new singles: "Amateurs" was released by 18 October 2019, "Pretty Great" was released on 17 January 2020 and "Eats Me Up" was released on 4 March 2020.

Fickle Friends provided a remix of the track "Kelly" by The Aces on 28 August 2020.

On 1st September 2020, they announced the structure and idea for their second studio Album Weird Years. Because they were unable to tour, they released the album in separate EPs or 'Seasons', taking inspiration from television. This was accompanied by the release of the first track of the EP "What a Time" on 4th September. Their second single "92" was released on 16 October. The third and final single "Million" was released on 20 November.
The first season was released on 15 January 2021.

The first single from Weird Years Season 2 "Not in the Mood" was released on 30th March 2021. The second single from the EP "Cosmic Coming of Age" was released on 14th April 2021.
Weird Years Season 2 was released on 7th May 2021.

On September 8, 2021, they announced their second studio album 'Are We Gonna Be Alright?' and released their first single of the album "Love You To Death". The second single "Alone" was released on October 13. The third and final single of the album "Yeah, Yeah, Yeah " was released on November 19.

Fickle Friends released a Christmas single "My Favourite Day" on December 1.

'Are We Gonna Be Alright?' was released on January 14.

Band members

Current
 Natassja Shiner – vocals, keyboard
 Jack Wilson – keyboard, guitar, backing vocals, samples, programming
 Jack 'Harry' Herrington – bass guitar, backing vocals
 Sam Morris – drums, percussion

Former
 Christopher Hall – guitar

Discography

Studio albums

Extended plays

Singles 
 "Swim" (2014)
 "Play" (2014)
 "For You" (2014)
 "Could Be Wrong" (2015)
 "Say No More" (2015)
 "Swim" (2016)
 "Cry Baby" (2016)
 "Brooklyn" (2016)
 "Hello Hello" (2017)
 "Glue" (2017)
 "Hard to Be Myself" (2017)
 "Swim" (2018) 
 "Say No More" (2018) 
 "Heartbroken" (2018) 
 "Broken Sleep" (2018)
 "The Moment" (2018)
 "San Francisco" (2018)
 "Amateurs" (2019)
 "Pretty Great" (2020)
 "Eats Me Up" (2020)
 "What A Time" (2020)
 "92" (2020)
 "Million" (2020)
 "Not in the Mood" (2021)
 "Cosmic Coming of Age" (2021)
 "Love You to Death" (2021)
 "Alone" (2021)
 "Yeah, Yeah, Yeah" (2021)
 "My Favourite Day" (2021)

Music videos

References

External links
 

British indie pop groups
English indie rock groups
Musical groups established in 2013
Musical groups from Brighton and Hove
2013 establishments in England